Alecton is a genus of firefly in the beetle family Lampyridae. The species A. discoidalis is the best known of the four species in the genus. Alecton is believed to be endemic to Cuba.

References 

Bioluminescent insects
Lampyridae
Lampyridae genera
Endemic fauna of Cuba